Golden Coast is Flow's third studio album. It reached #9 on the Oricon charts  and charted for 8 weeks.

Track listing

References

2005 albums
Flow (band) albums